The 1978 All-Ireland Senior Camogie Championship Final was the 47th All-Ireland Final and the deciding match of the 1978 All-Ireland Senior Camogie Championship, an inter-county camogie tournament for the top teams in Ireland.

Cork bridged a five-year gap with an easy victory.

References

All-Ireland Senior Camogie Championship Final
All-Ireland Senior Camogie Championship Final
All-Ireland Senior Camogie Championship Final, 1978
All-Ireland Senior Camogie Championship Finals
Cork county camogie team matches
Dublin county camogie team matches